Pontigné is a former commune in the Maine-et-Loire département in western France. On 1 January 2013, it was merged with the former communes of Baugé, Montpollin, Saint-Martin-d'Arcé and Le Vieil-Baugé to create the commune of Baugé-en-Anjou. Its population was 225 in 2019.

See also
Communes of the Maine-et-Loire department

References

Former communes of Maine-et-Loire